Leonard Millard (7 March 1919 – 15 March 1997) was an English footballer who played the majority of his career at left back.

Biography 
Millard was born in Coseley, Staffordshire and joined West Bromwich Albion as an amateur in May 1937. He turned professional in September 1942, having already made his debut during the previous month against Northampton Town in the Football League South. He later became club captain, leading the club to a 3–2 victory over Preston North End in the 1954 FA Cup Final at Wembley. He made a total of 476 appearances for Albion. In 1989, he had a leg amputated and he died in Coseley in 1997. He lived a happy life with his family.

References

External links
 Englandstats.com profile

1919 births
1997 deaths
People from Coseley
English footballers
Association football defenders
West Bromwich Albion F.C. players
FA Cup Final players
English disabled sportspeople
English amputees
Association footballers with limb difference